Arbnor Fatmir Muçolli (born 15 September 1999) is an Albanian professional footballer who plays as a left winger for Vejle Boldklub. Born in Denmark, he plays for the Albania national team.

Club career

Early career
Muçolli was born in Fredericia, Denmark to Albanian parents originally from Kosovar city Podujevo as second child after his brother Agon which is also professional footballer. Both brothers were registered to local club Fredericia at age around 5, prompted by their mother, also to say that their father was a footballer with great technique abilities but unable to play in higher levels due to the Kosovo War.

Vejle Boldklub
A central midfielder, Muçolli made his debut for Vejle Boldklub on 17 November 2016, aged 17, in a match against Næstved BK, playing a total of 80 minutes before being substituted. He started alongside his brother, Agon Muçolli, both youth products of Vejle Boldklub.

Muçolli was injured during most of the 2017–18 season, where Vejle secured promotion to the Danish Superliga. He made 15 league appearances during the season, only one after the winter break.

For the 2018–19 season, Muçolli was a first team regular for Vejle in the highest tier of Danish football. On 25 July 2018, he extended his contract with the club, keeping him in Vejle until 2020.

During the 2019–20 season in the Danish 1st Division he was most distinguished playing in 26 league appearances and netting 7 goals more than any other season to help Vejle to gain a return in the elite tier. He was also voted as the best player of the season. He debutted in the new season 2020–21 in Danish Superliga playing as a substitute quarter hour from the end with score at 2–1 and after only 10 minutes he managed to score a goal which succeded with one more in the closing moments of the match as Vejle took a 4–1 home victory, where also Muçolli was rated with higher note 10.

He debutted in the new year 2023 with a goal scored against Fremad Amager on 18 February 2023 for a 4–1 win.

International career
Born in Denmark, Muçolli is of Albanian descent. He was capped 4 times for Denmark national under-18 team, making his debut on 8 March 2017 against Italy entering as a substitute in the 68th minute.

Albania
In September 2017 the Albania national under-21 teams coach Alban Bushi confirmed that both Muçolli's brothers will join his national side, brokered by fellow U21 international Ylber Ramadani, a recent arrival in Vejle. He received Albanian citizenship on 8 February 2018, thus becoming eligible to switch for the Albania national youth teams. He was invited along his brother Agon at Albania national under-20 team by coach Alban Bushi, but Arbnor himself had to withdraw due to an injury. He debutted subsequently as "red and black" next year for Albania U20 on 21 January 2018 against Azerbaijan with his side winning 1–0 and Muçolli making an impressive performance, rated by coach Alban Bushi like a future talent.

Albania U21: UEFA European Under-21 Championship qualification
Muçolli was called up for the first time for a competitive match against Spain on 6 September 2018 valid for the 2019 UEFA European Under-21 Championship qualification Group 2 3rd last round-matches. He made his competitive debut against Spain 9 days before his 19th birth-day, coming on the field instead of Fiorin Durmishaj in the 70th minute, but however unable to help his side to avoid a 3–0 away loss. He was called up also for two last qualifiers matches against Spain & Estonia on 11 & 16 October 2018. He played as a starter against Spain and was substituted off in the 67th minute with score at 0–0 but Albania U21 conceded subsequently a late goal in the 84th minute to lose the game. Then he played the full 90-minutes match against Estonia helping his side to achieve a 2–2 draw.

He participated also in the next qualification campaign for under-21 retaining his starting place under same coach Alban Bushi and playing in 3 of 4 first matches for the 2021 UEFA European Under-21 Championship qualification Group 3 completing also 2 full 90-minutes, but Albania U21 took only 1 point versus Andorra, losing twice at home against Turkey 1–2 and Austria 0–4. Then he was benched for the next fixture at home on 15 October 2019 against Kosovo but came in as a substitute in the 61st minute with score at 0–0 replacing the attacking midfielder Sherif Kallaku and quarter hour after he managed to provide an assist from a free kick for the Shaqir Tafas opening goal and also scoring himself after another 5 minutes after an individual action outside the area and breaking Kosovo's defence as Albania U21 eventually won 2–1. Then in the next month November he was called up against England but withdrew due to an injury suffered during the gathering.

Senior team
He debuted with the senior Albania national team in a friendly 0–0 tie with Estonia on 13 June 2022.

Career statistics

Club

International

References

Danish men's footballers
1999 births
Living people
People from Fredericia
Sportspeople from the Region of Southern Denmark
Albanian footballers
Albania international footballers
Albania under-21 international footballers
Albania youth international footballers
Denmark youth international footballers
Albanian expatriate footballers
Albanian expatriates in Denmark
Expatriate footballers in Denmark
Albanian expatriate sportspeople in Denmark
Danish people of Albanian descent
Danish Superliga players
Danish 1st Division players
Vejle Boldklub players
Association football midfielders